Only the Blues is a 1957 album by Sonny Stitt, accompanied by Roy Eldridge and Oscar Peterson.

Track listing
 "The String (The Eternal Triangle)" (Sonny Stitt) – 10:01
 "Cleveland Blues" (Stitt) – 12:02
 "B.W. Blues (Boogie Woogie Blues)" (Stitt) – 11:35
 "Blues for Bags" (Stitt) – 10:39
 Studio outtakes included on the CD reissue:
 "I Didn't Know What Time It Was" (Lorenz Hart, Richard Rodgers) – 3:31
 "I Remember You" (Johnny Mercer, Victor Schertzinger) – 3:54
 "I Know That You Know" (Anne Caldwell, Vincent Youmans) – 4:39
 "I Know That You Know" (False Start) – 4:55
 "I Know That You Know" – 4:47
 "I Know That You Know" (Coda Rehearsal) – 3:19
 "I Know That You Know" (Composite Master Take) – 4:43
A subsequent Fresh Sound CD issue gives tracks 5 and 6 plus I Know That You Know with only 1 alternate take.

Personnel

Performance
 Sonny Stitt - alto saxophone
 Roy Eldridge - trumpet
 Oscar Peterson – piano
 Ray Brown – double bass
 Herb Ellis - guitar
 Stan Levey - drums

References

1957 albums
Sonny Stitt albums
Albums produced by Norman Granz
Verve Records albums